Koniecmosty  is a village in the administrative district of Gmina Wiślica, within Busko County, Świętokrzyskie Voivodeship, in south-central Poland.

References

See also
 The Lesser Polish Way

Koniecmosty